Jennica is a female given name. Notable people with the name include:

Jennica Garcia (born 1989), Filipino actress, host, and director
Jennica Haikarainen (born 1989), Finnish ice hockey player
Jennica Harper, Canadian television writer and producer
Jennica Sanchez, contestant on series five of Asia's Next Top Model 

Feminine given names